Khlong Khut Railway Halt is a railway halt located in Tha Chang Subdistrict, Tha Chang District, Surat Thani.

Train services 
 Local No. 445/446 Chumphon-Hat Yai Junction-Chumphon

References 
 
 

Railway stations in Thailand